Wow or WoW may refer to:

Games and toys
World of Warcraft, a massively multiplayer online role-playing game 
World of Warplanes, an online flight simulator
World of Warships, an online naval simulator
Wizard of Wor, a 1981 arcade game by Midway
Sega Wow, a video game company
Worlds of Wonder (toy company), a 1980s American toy company

Music
Wow (band), a Dutch 1990s girl group
WOW Music, a Hong Kong record label
SRS Wow, and SRS Wow HD, an audio enhancement suite of Sound Retrieval System technologies
Wow, a member of the animated girl group VBirds

Albums
WOW (Wendy O. Williams album), a 1984 album by Wendy O. Williams
Wow! (Bananarama album), 1987
Wow! (Bill Doggett album), 1965
Wow/Grape Jam, a 1968 album by Moby Grape
WOW (Junko Onishi album), 1993
WOW (Mouse on Mars album), a 2012 mini album by Mouse on Mars
Wow (Superbus album), 2006 
Wow (Bibi Zhou album), 2007
Wow (Verdena album), 2011
WOW series, a series of compilation albums of contemporary Christian music

Songs
"Wow" (Kate Bush song), 1979
"Wow" (Kylie Minogue song), 2008
"Wow" (Ruslana song), 2011
"Wow" (Inna song), 2012
"Wow" (Beck song), 2016
"Wow" (Marilyn Manson song), 2009
"Wow" (Post Malone song), 2018
"Wow" (Zara Larsson song), 2020
"Wow", a 2003 song by Snow Patrol from Final Straw

Organizations and companies

War on Want, a British anti-poverty charity
Warbirds Over Wanaka, a biennial international airshow held in New Zealand
Wide Open West, an American ISP, internet, cable, and phone company
Wider Opportunities for Women, U.S. non-profit
Women of the Wall, a Jewish women's organization in Israel
Women of the World Festival, a festival based in London with global satellite venues
Women of Wrestling, an American women's wrestling promotion
Women on Waves, a Dutch pro-choice non-profit organization
Women on Web, a Canadian pro-choice non-profit organization
Woodmen of the World, a fraternal organization in Omaha, Nebraska, United States
Woolworths Limited, an Australian retailing company, by Australian Stock Exchange code
World of Wearable Art, a museum and award show in New Zealand
World of Wonder (company), an American production company
World Organization of Workers, an international trade union federation
WOW! (online service), a defunct ISP from CompuServe
WOW Promotions, an American mixed martial arts organization
WOW Sight & Sound, an Australian electronics and music retailer

Places
WOW counties, Waukesha, Ozaukee, and Washington counties of Wisconsin
Wau, South Sudan (or Wow), a town in South Sudan

Television, radio and film
World of Winx (also titled Winx Club WOW), a spin-off of Winx Club
WOW (channel), an Indian television channel in Mumbai
WOW (TV station), the local WIN Television station broadcasting to remote Western Australia
KXSP, formerly known as WOW, a radio station in Omaha, Nebraska
WOWT, formerly known as WOW-TV, a TV station in Omaha, Nebraska
WOW: The CatholicTV Challenge, a television game show
WOW! (TV series), a 1996 UK CITV programme
Wow (film), a 1970 Québécois movie directed by Claude Jutra

Transport
WOW air, an Icelandic low-cost airline. 
WOW Alliance, a global air-cargo alliance
Air Southwest, an airline based in the Southwest of England, by ICAO Airline Code
Woolwich railway station, London, England, by National Rail station code

Other
Way of working or ways of working, a concept for software development in disciplined agile delivery within the project management framework Disciplined Agile Toolkit
Lay's WOW chips, a brand of fat-free potato chips
Wendy O. Williams (1949–1998), U.S. singer
Windows on Windows, an application compatibility layer in 32-bit Microsoft Windows
WoW64, an application compatibility layer in 64-bit Microsoft Windows
Wow! (comic), a British comic from 1982–1983
Wow (recording), a pitch variation while playing a sound recording
WOW Film Festival (disambiguation), several film festivals
Wow! signal, a strong radio signal of unknown origin detected by a SETI project in 1977

See also

Pow wow (disambiguation)

The WOW! Awards